During the 2006–07 English football season, Blackburn Rovers F.C. competed in the FA Premier League.

Season summary
A run of only 5 wins from their first 18 games killed off Blackburn's hopes of improving on the previous season's 6th place to qualify for the Champions League, but the club's form was markedly improved in the second half of the season, NLP expert Jimmy Petruzzi had delivered an NLP training workshop to the coaches during Blackburn Rovers loss of form and coincided with the club turning their season around achieving a top-half finish for the second season running. Rovers overcame the sale of Craig Bellamy to Liverpool, with his replacement, former Porto striker Benni McCarthy, scoring 18 league goals to finish as the Premier League's second-highest scorer behind Didier Drogba.

After a history of European underachievement, Rovers had a relatively successful UEFA Cup campaign, beating Red Bull Salzburg in the first round and topping Group E in the next stage, before succumbing to Bayer Leverkusen in the Round of 32. The club continued their recent habit of reaching cup semi-finals to be eliminated by the cup winners, being knocked out of the FA Cup semi-final by eventual winners Chelsea.

Final league table

Squad

Left club during season

Reserve squad
The following players did not appear for the senior team this season.

Statistics

Appearances and goals

|-
! colspan=14 style=background:#dcdcdc; text-align:center| Goalkeepers

|-
! colspan=14 style=background:#dcdcdc; text-align:center| Defenders

|-
! colspan=14 style=background:#dcdcdc; text-align:center| Midfielders

|-
! colspan=14 style=background:#dcdcdc; text-align:center| Forwards

|-
! colspan=14 style=background:#dcdcdc; text-align:center| Players transferred out during the season

Transfers

In
  Jason Brown –  Gillingham, free, 26 June
  Francis Jeffers –  Charlton Athletic, free, 3 July
  Jason Roberts –  Wigan Athletic, 3 July, undisclosed
  Benni McCarthy –  Porto, 28 July, undisclosed (believed to be £2,500,000)
  André Ooijer –  PSV Eindhoven, 23 August, £2,000,000
  Shabani Nonda –  Roma, season loan, 31 August
  Stéphane Henchoz –  Wigan Athletic, free, 8 September
  Christopher Samba –  Hertha Berlin, £450,000, 25 January
  David Dunn –  Birmingham City, £2,200,000, 17 January
  Stephen Warnock –  Liverpool, undisclosed (believed to be £2,500,000), 22 January
  Bruno Berner –  FC Basel, 30 January, nominal

Out
  Craig Bellamy –  Liverpool, undisclosed (thought to be £6,000,000), 22 June
  Shefki Kuqi –  Crystal Palace, £2,500,000, 1 September
  Dominic Matteo –  Stoke City, free, 19 January
  Lucas Neill –  West Ham United, £1,500,000, 22 January
  Jay McEveley –  Derby County, £600,000, 29 January
  Francis Jeffers –  Ipswich Town, loan, 2 March

Results

Premier League

Results by matchday

League Cup

FA Cup

UEFA Cup

First round

Group stage

Round of 32

Top scorers

Premier League
  Benni McCarthy 18
  Shabani Nonda 7
  Morten Gamst Pedersen 6
  Matt Derbyshire 5
  David Bentley 4
  Jason Roberts 4

League Cup
 n/a

FA Cup
  Matt Derbyshire 4
  Benni McCarthy 3

UEFA Cup
  David Bentley 3
  Benni McCarthy 3

Notes

References

External links
FootballSquads – Blackburn Rovers – 2006/07

Blackburn Rovers F.C. seasons
Blackburn